Ángel Aguirre Herrera (born 26 October 1984) is a Mexican politician from the Party of the Democratic Revolution. From 2009 to 2012 he served as Deputy of the LXI Legislature of the Mexican Congress representing Guerrero. He died from a brain aneurysm in 2017.

References

1984 births
Living people
Politicians from Guerrero
People from Chilpancingo
Party of the Democratic Revolution politicians
21st-century Mexican politicians
Universidad Iberoamericana alumni
Deputies of the LXI Legislature of Mexico
Members of the Chamber of Deputies (Mexico) for Guerrero